Jinan Metro Line 1 is a rapid transit line in Jinan, China. The line uses four-car Type B rolling stock, with an option to expand to six-car Type B in the future.

The line began operating on April 1, 2019.

Timeline

Stations

References

01
2019 establishments in China
Railway lines opened in 2019